Siderin is a bio-active coumarin derivative produced by Aspergillus versicolor, an endophytic fungus found in the green alga Halimeda opuntia in the Red Sea.

External links
 Bioactive anthraquinones from endophytic fungus Aspergillus versicolor isolated from red sea algae

Coumarins
Methoxy compounds